JS Shiranui (DD-120) is the second ship of the Asahi-class destroyer of the Japanese Maritime Self-Defense Force. Her namesake came from the optical phenomenon called Shiranui, or "Phosphorescent Light".

Development 
The procurement of the destroyer began in 2013 in response to the reduction in the number of destroyers (namely the ) within the JMSDF. The two major characteristics of this destroyer is its bigger emphasis on anti-submarine warfare and the adoption of the COGLAG (combined gas turbine electric and gas turbine) propulsion system. A second destroyer was procured a year later.

Construction and career
She was laid down on  20 May 2016  and launched on  12 October 2017. Commissioned on  27 February 2019 with the hull number DD-120.

Gallery

References

Ships of the Japan Maritime Self-Defense Force
Ships built by Mitsubishi Heavy Industries
2017 ships
Asahi-class destroyers